Chester Grey Friary was a friary in Cheshire, England.

Monasteries in Cheshire